Mila Schön (born Maria Carmen Nutrizio; September 28, 1916 – September 5, 2008) was an Italian fashion designer. Her surname was also spelled as Schoen.

Early life 
Born Maria Carmen Nutrizio in Trogir to wealthy Dalmatian Italian aristocratic parents, her younger brother was journalist and newspaper editor Stefano "Nino" Nutrizio. With the breakup of the Austro-Hungarian Empire at the end of World War I, Schön's family lost their estates.  The family moved to Italy where Schön's father managed a pharmacy.

During World War II, Mila married Aurelio Schön, an Austrian precious metals dealer, whom she met in Milan.  In the postwar period, Schön enjoyed a brief return to wealth. She became a client of the most prestigious Parisian couture houses such as Balenciaga and Dior.

Fashion career 
Following the failure of her husband's business and the couple's divorce, Mila once again found herself without financial resources. Unable to afford Parisian couture, Schön  paid skilled Milanese seamstresses to copy the latest couture.  Other women soon expressed interest in Schön's designs and in 1958 Schön and her mother opened a workshop. Schön had her first show in 1965 and in 1966 she opened a boutique on Via Monte Napoleone, the center of the Milan fashion world.  The Via Monte Napoleone shop was decorated with modern furniture by Joe Colombo and Eero Saarinen.

In 1965, Schön showed her collection at the Pitti Palace in Florence along with other major Italian designers. For this show, all of Schön's fashion were in various shades of violet.  Afterwards, The New York Times called her “the shrinking violet of the Italian haute couture” (1968) and declared she did not “make clothes for shrinking violets" (1973).
Her work was introduced in the United States in 1967 in Dallas and Houston by Neiman Marcus. In 1969, she designed uniforms for Air Italia. Schön's men's line and her first prêt-à-porter collection for women appeared in 1971.  In 1972, she designed uniforms for Iran Air. She was the first Italian designer to show ready-to-wear in Japan. By the 1980s, Schön had shops in Italy, Japan, and the United States with offerings that included handbags and shoes, lingerie and watches, perfume, swimwear and eyewear.  In 1992, she designed the Italian national team at the 1992 Barcelona Olympics.

In 1993, the brand was taken over by Itochu, a Japanese conglomerate, which sold it to Burani. In 2007, the brand was acquired by an Italian company, Brand Extension.  In 2005, Ronna was the Mila Schön ready-to-wear license holder in Japan with retail value of €30 million.

Style and influence 
According to The Telegraph, Schön's work "combined Balenciaga's austerity of cut, Dior's versatility and a dash of Schiaparelli's wit." Her clothing was often geometric and according to Frances D'emilio at The Boston Globe, "fashion-world examples of cubism."  Schön signatures included intricate beading and wool coats that eschewed traditional linings in favor of “double facing” (two layers of wool stitched together).

Her designs borrowed from the modern art she collected - Victor Vasarely, Kenneth Noland, Alexander Calder, Lucio Fontana. Examples of Schön's work are held by museums such as the Metropolitan Museum of Art and the Victoria and Albert Museum.  Shortly after Schön's death in 2008, Milan's Palazzo Reale exhibited a retrospective of her work.

Famous clients 
Schön's clients included Jacqueline Kennedy, Lee Radziwill, Marella Agnelli, Farah Diba, Imelda Marcos,  and Brooke Astor. At Truman Capote's 1966 black-and-white ball, Marella Agnelli was voted the best-dressed guest in a kaftan embroidered by Schön's craftswomen.  The third in the best-dressed guest contest was Lee Radziwill in a sequined Schön shift.

References

External links
Mila Schön Website
Mila Schön via Modern Fashion Encyclopedia
Mila Schön house in Trogir

1916 births
2008 deaths
Fashion designers from Milan
Italian fashion designers
Italian women fashion designers
Yugoslav nobility
People from Trogir
People from the Kingdom of Dalmatia